Mojtaba Nassirnia Farouji (born 9 September 1985) is an Iranian professional futsal player. He is currently a member of Safir Gofteman in the Iranian Futsal Super League.

Honours

Country 
 AFC Futsal Championship
 Champion (1): 2010
 Asian Indoor and Martial Arts Games
 Champion (1): 2009
 WAFF Futsal Championship
 Champion (1): 2012

Club 
 AFC Futsal Club Championship
 Runner-Up (2): 2011 (Shahid Mansouri) - 2013 (Giti Pasand)
 Iranian Futsal Super League
 Champion (2): 2010–11 (Shahid Mansouri) - 2011–12 (Shahid Mansouri)
 Runner-Up (2): 2007–08 (Shahid Mansouri) - 2009–10 (Shahid Mansouri)

References

External links
 
 FFIRI.ir

1985 births
Living people
Sportspeople from Tehran
Iranian men's futsal players
Futsal goalkeepers
Shahid Mansouri FSC players
Giti Pasand FSC players
Almas Shahr Qom FSC players
Shahrdari Saveh FSC players